The Freccia is an Italian 8x8 wheeled Infantry fighting vehicle in use with the Italian Army. The first batch of 249 vehicles were ordered to replace Cold War VCC-2 armoured personnel carriers of the Mechanized Brigade "Pinerolo" in Southern Italy. The Freccia is built by a consortium combining Iveco (hull, engine, suspension) and Oto Melara (armament).

Design
The Freccia is up-armoured and improved variant of the wheeled Centauro tank destroyer fitted with the Hitfist turret (an evolution of the turret used on the Dardo infantry fighting vehicle), which is armed with an Oerlikon KBA 25mm autocannon and carries 200 rounds of 25×137mm ammunition. Two 7.62mm NATO machine guns are also fitted. Additionally, a pair of Spike MR/LR anti-tank missiles can be fitted on the turret. The Hitfist turret could theoretically also fit cannons and guns of up to 60mm calibre. Four 80mm smoke grenade launchers are mounted on each side of the turret. The fire control system is the same as for the Centauro reconnaissance/anti-tank version. The Freccia can carry up to eight combat-ready troops.

Procurement
In 2006, the Italian government ordered a first batch of 249 Freccia vehicles in the versions: 190 Combat, 36 Combat Anti-tank, 2 Command Post and 21 Mortar Carrier. All of these were delivered by 6 June 2017 and used to equip the Mechanized Brigade "Pinerolo".

In December 2019 a further 81 Freccia were ordered: 5 Combat, 36 Combat Anti-tank, 26 Command Post and 14 Mortar Carrier.

An additional 300 Freccia EVO will be ordered: 180 in various versions to complete the accouterment of the Mechanized Brigade "Aosta", and 120 Freccia EVO Reconnaissance to equip the army's cavalry regiments.

Variants 

 Freccia Combat, with a two-man Hitfist turret with KBA 25mm autocannon
 Freccia Combat Anti-tank, with a two-man Hitfist turret with KBA 25mm autocannon and dual Spike LR anti-tank missile launcher 
 Freccia Command Post, in two versions: Freccia Tactical Squad and Freccia Command Squad
 Freccia Mortar Carrier, with TDA-2R2M 120mm mortar

Freccia EVO 
The Freccia EVO is a development of the Centauro II with a remote Hitfist OWS turret with 30mm autocannon. The army plans to acquire 300 Freccia EVO, 120 of which in the Reconnaissance variant.

 Freccia EVO Combat, with a remote Hitfist OWS turret with 30mm autocannon
 Freccia EVO Reconnaissance, with a remote Hitfist OWS turret with 30mm autocannon and Janus sensor mast

Current operators 

Italian Army - the Freccia EVO reconnaissance and Centauro II will equip the army's cavalry regiments:
 Mechanized Brigade "Pinerolo":
 9th Infantry Regiment "Bari"
 7th Bersaglieri Regiment
 82nd Infantry Regiment "Torino"
 Mechanized Brigade "Aosta"
 5th Infantry Regiment "Aosta"
 6th Bersaglieri Regiment
 62nd Infantry Regiment "Sicilia"
 Mechanized Brigade "Sassari":
 3rd Bersaglieri Regiment

See also

Comparable vehicles

 Stryker
 LAV III/LAV AFV/LAV-25/ASLAV
 K808 Armored Personnel Carrier
 Tusan AFV
 Boxer
 BTR-90
 CM-32
 Type 96 Armored Personnel Carrier
 Type 16 maneuver combat vehicle
 Patria AMV
 BTR-4
 Saur 2
 VBCI
 KTO Rosomak
 FNSS Pars
 MOWAG Piranha

References

External links
 Italian Army homepage: Freccia
 Official website

Infantry fighting vehicles of Italy
Wheeled infantry fighting vehicles
Iveco vehicles
Eight-wheeled vehicles
Military vehicles introduced in the 2000s
Armoured personnel carriers of Italy